"Greed" is a song by the band Godsmack. It served as the third and final single from their second album, Awake, released in 2001.

Music video
A video was produced for "Greed." The woman seen on the album cover of Godsmack's self-titled debut makes a brief cameo at the very beginning of the video. Erna described in a Fuse TV interview the difficulty they had in tracking her down for the role.

"Greed" has the band living in a rundown apartment owned by a rich, unsympathetic landlord. The group finally has enough of their poor living conditions and tramples the landlord at the end of the video, leaving him in a humorous slump in his underwear. The video frequently cuts between the story aspect to band performance, featuring the group dressing in black and silver, performing in a spacious silver room with the Godsmack logo imprinted on the floor.

The video for "Greed" is rather unusual for Godsmack in that it follows an actual story rather than loosely connected elements and aesthetics. Also of note is its lighter, somewhat humorous nature compared to previous Godsmack videos. Erna stated that it was their attempt at fitting in with the more mainstream music video crowd and that he was not pleased with it.

Chart positions 

Singles  U.S. Billboard

External links

2001 singles
Godsmack songs
2000 songs
Songs written by Sully Erna
Republic Records singles